The Bratislava Marathon (also known as the Bratislava City Marathon, as well as the ČSOB Bratislava Marathon for sponsorship reasons), is an annual road-based marathon hosted by Bratislava, Slovakia.  The current version of the marathon has been held since 2006, although the first marathon to be held regularly in Bratislava was inaugurated in 1932.

The marathon is a World Athletics Label Road Race and a member of the Association of International Marathons and Distance Races (AIMS).  During the race weekend, a half marathon, a 10K run, a 4.2K run are also offered.  A relay option is also offered for the full and half marathon distances.

Notes

References

External links 
 Official website

2006 establishments in Slovakia
Annual sporting events in Slovakia
April sporting events
Athletics competitions in Slovakia
Autumn events in Czechoslovakia
Marathons in Europe
Recurring sporting events established in 2006
Sports competitions in Bratislava
Sports competitions in Czechoslovakia
Spring (season) events in Slovakia